Mallomonas lacuna is a species of heterokont algae. It is a tiny free-living cell, about the width of a human hair. It has ornate scales and bristles, as well as long spines. It is a relatively common part of lake or pond plankton. It differs from its cogenerates by the number, distribution, and size of its base plate pores, the secondary structures on the scale surfaces, together with characteristics of its bristles.

References

Further reading

Kim, Han Soon, et al. "Mallomonas elevata sp. nov.(Synurophyceae), a new scaled Chrysophyte from Jeju Island, South Korea." Nova Hedwigia 98.1-2 (2014): 89-102.

External links
 AlgaeBase

Ochrophyta
Protists described in 2013